Veronika Shutkova (born  May 26, 1986, Minsk) is a Belarusian long jumper.

International competitions

References

External links
 
 
 

1986 births
Living people
Belarusian female long jumpers
Athletes (track and field) at the 2012 Summer Olympics
Olympic athletes of Belarus
Competitors at the 2005 Summer Universiade
Competitors at the 2007 Summer Universiade
Competitors at the 2009 Summer Universiade
Athletes from Minsk